James Edwin Strausbaugh (February 25, 1918 – November 25, 1991) was an American football halfback who played one season with the Chicago Cardinals of the National Football League (NFL). He was drafted by the Green Bay Packers in the 20th round of the 1941 NFL Draft. He played college football at Ohio State University and attended Chillicothe High School in Chillicothe, Ohio.

References

External links
Just Sports Stats

1918 births
1991 deaths
Players of American football from Ohio
American football halfbacks
Ohio State Buckeyes football players
Chicago Cardinals players
Sportspeople from Chillicothe, Ohio